Vyshetalovsky is a rural locality (a selo) in Ullubiyevsky Selsoviet, Tarumovsky District, Republic of Dagestan, Russia. The population was 320 as of 2010. There are 3 streets.

Geography 
Vyshetalovsky is located 26 km southeast of Tarumovka (the district's administrative centre) by road. Vyshe-Talovka is the nearest rural locality.

References 

Rural localities in Tarumovsky District